Trenton is the county seat and fourth largest city of Gibson County, Tennessee, United States. The population was 4,264 at the 2010 census, down from 4,683 in 2000.

History

Trenton was established in 1824 as a county seat for the newly-created Gibson County. The site was initially home to a trading post known as "Gibson-Port" that was operated by Thomas Gibson, a brother of the county's namesake, Colonel John Gibson.  The city is named for Trenton, New Jersey.

Geography
Trenton is located in central Gibson County at  (35.973627, −88.941569). U.S. Route 45W passes through the east side of the city, bypassing downtown. It leads north  to Union City and south  to Jackson.

Demographics

2020 census

As of the 2020 United States Census, there were 4,240 people, 1,688 households, and 910 families residing in the city.

2000 census
As of the census of 2000, there were 4,683 people, 1,919 households, and 1,207 families residing in the city. The population density was 847.3 people per square mile (327.0/km2). There were 2,090 housing units at an average density of 378.2 per square mile (145.9/km2). The racial makeup of the city was 65.17% White, 32.67% African American, 0.09% Native American, 0.26% Asian, 0.98% from other races, and 0.83% from two or more races. Hispanic or Latino of any race were 1.71% of the population.

There were 1,919 households, out of which 29.1% had children under the age of 18 living with them, 38.9% were married couples living together, 20.6% had a female householder with no husband present, and 37.1% were non-families. 34.1% of all households were made up of individuals, and 16.2% had someone living alone who was 65 years of age or older. The average household size was 2.29 and the average family size was 2.90.

In the city, the population was spread out, with 24.2% under the age of 18, 9.1% from 18 to 24, 26.1% from 25 to 44, 22.4% from 45 to 64, and 18.2% who were 65 years of age or older. The median age was 38 years. For every 100 females, there were 84.3 males. For every 100 females age 18 and over, there were 81.2 males.

The median income for a household in the city was $27,535, and the median income for a family was $39,630. Males had a median income of $29,675 versus $20,801 for females. The per capita income for the city was $16,225. About 12.9% of families and 17.6% of the population were below the poverty line, including 26.4% of those under age 18 and 19.5% of those age 65 or over.

Culture

Trenton is most famous for its collection of rare antique porcelain veilleuses, donated by the late Dr. Frederick C. Freed in 1955. The teapots are unique because the candle's glow illuminates the pot's exterior, thus serving as a night light. None of the 525 teapots in this collection are alike, and some are designed as palaces or people in unique still-life castings. The town celebrates its collection with an annual "Teapot Festival" held each spring since 1981.

Nite Lite Theatre of Gibson County is a non-profit community theatre project based in Trenton, and established in 1980 with the intent of bringing theatrical presentations to Gibson and the surrounding counties. All work, with the exception of some production staff, is done on a volunteer basis. With most performances at Peabody High School, the history of Nite Lite Theatre includes performances of The Man Who Came to Dinner, The Sound of Music, Dearly Departed, and You Can't Take It with You.

Notable people
 Robert M. Bond, United States Air Force general
 Dave Brown, meteorologist and weatherman for Memphis TV station WMC channel 5, an NBC affiliate
 Eugenia Winwood (nee Crafton), wife of Steve Winwood
 John Wesley Crockett, member of the United States House of Representatives who was born in Trenton
 Gene Hickerson, Hall of Fame offensive lineman for the Cleveland Browns was born in Trenton
 Lew Jetton, known as a blues guitarist/singer, while also spending many years as a meteorologist and local television personality, was raised near Trenton
 Ben H. Love, eighth Chief Scout Executive of the Boy Scouts of America
 Peter Matthew Hillsman Taylor, author of the novel A Summons to Memphis, which won the Pulitzer Prize for Fiction in 1987
 Wallace Wade, college football coach
 Bailey Walsh, politician
 William Woods, Major League Baseball pitcher

Education
Trenton Special School District operates Trenton's K-12 public schools. Peabody High School in Trenton was established in 1877. Dyersburg State Community College has a campus adjacent to Peabody High School.

Media
Radio stations:
 WPOT AM 1500 (simulcast with WJPJ) GoodNews Christian Network 
 WTPR-AM 710 "The Greatest Hits of All Time"

Newspapers
 The Gazette (formerly The Herald Gazette)

Sports
The Trenton Reds, a Minor League Baseball team of the Kentucky–Illinois–Tennessee League, played in Trenton in 1922. The city shared the same league's Milan-Trenton Twins with nearby Milan in 1923.

References

External links

 City of Trenton official website
 Trenton Teapot Collection

Cities in Tennessee
Cities in Gibson County, Tennessee
County seats in Tennessee